The 1932 Campeonato Cariocawas the 27th edition of the Rio de Janeiro state championship. Twelve teams participated. Botafogo won the title for the 5th time.

Participating teams

Format 
The tournament was disputed in a double round-robin format, with the team with the most points winning the title.

Championship

References 

Campeonato Carioca seasons
Carioca